Wilczak  was a village in the administrative district of Gmina Biecz, within Gorlice County, Lesser Poland Voivodeship, in southern Poland. Now it is part of the village Strzeszyn.

References

Wilczak